Naqdi Rural District is in Meshgin-e Sharqi  District of Meshgin Shahr County, Ardabil province, Iran. At the census of 2006, its population was 3,582 in 846 households; there were 2,741 inhabitants in 809 households at the following census of 2011; and in the most recent census of 2016, the population of the rural district was 1,949 in 731 households. The largest of its 17 villages was Naqdi-ye Olya, with 738 people.

References 

Meshgin Shahr County

Rural Districts of Ardabil Province

Populated places in Ardabil Province

Populated places in Meshgin Shahr County